Sacred Heart Academy Bryn Mawr, commonly referred to as, SHA or Sacred Heart, is a highly selective, independent, private, Roman Catholic school for girls.  Sacred Heart is located on the Main Line in Bryn Mawr, Pennsylvania and consists of a Lower, Middle, and Upper School with approximately 232 in enrollment. The school is a member of the Pennsylvania Association of Independent Schools.

History
Sacred Heart Academy Bryn Mawr was established in 1865 by the Religious of the Sacred Heart.  It has been lay owned and operated since 1969.  It joined the Network of Sacred Heart Schools in 1999, reuniting it with its roots. Located in Bryn Mawr, Pennsylvania in the heart of the Philadelphia Main Line, Sacred Heart serves families in the greater Philadelphia area and surrounding Delaware Valley region.

Academic curriculum
Sacred Heart Academy Bryn Mawr is an independent, Catholic college-preparatory K-12 school for girls and has been in continuous operation for over 150 years.

Athletics 
Sacred Heart's high school participates in 10 varsity sports, including: Cross Country Running, Field Hockey, Golf, Tennis, Volleyball, Basketball, Crew, Lacrosse, Softball, and Track

Sacred Heart's middle school participates in Field Hockey, Basketball, Crew (club), Tennis, and Lacrosse.

Tuition (2021-2022)
Kindergarten  $13,260
Lower school  $15,165
Middle school $17,715
Upper  school $21,960

Scholarships
Entering ninth-grade students are eligible for merit scholarships.  Academic scholarships are awarded to students who demonstrate exceptional academic ability.  A scholarship entrance exam is given in the fall.  Scholarships may also be awarded to students with talent in Art or Music. Entering sixth-grade students are eligible for merit scholarships. The scholarship entrance exam is administered in winter.

Scholarships include: 
 The Sister Matthew Anita MacDonald Scholarship
 The Jeannine Broussard ’85 Scholarship
 The Mae Mac Neal Cardone Scholarship
 The Editha R. DeLone ’38 Scholarship
 The Mary Jane Powers Scholarship
 The Patricia Ryan Scholarship
 The Gerald P. Rorer Scholarship
 The St. Philippine Duchesne Scholarship.

Notable alumni
 Mary T. Clark, American academic, civil rights advocate, and Augustine of Hippo expert
 Elizabeth Plater-Zyberk, co-founder of the Congress for the New Urbanism and University of Miami architecture professor

Notes and references

External links
 Official website

Catholic secondary schools in Pennsylvania
Educational institutions established in 1865
Girls' schools in Pennsylvania
Sacred Heart schools in the United States
Schools in Delaware County, Pennsylvania
Private middle schools in Pennsylvania
Private elementary schools in Pennsylvania
Private high schools in Pennsylvania
High schools in Philadelphia
1865 establishments in Pennsylvania